Manly is a former locality in Parkland County, Alberta.  Manly was named for Manley, England.  The first post office opened in Manly in 1908.  Manly Corner, the beginning of Highway 43, which goes north to the Alaska Highway, is located in this district.

References 

Localities in Parkland County